Colegio Francés del Pedregal is a private school in Jardines del Pedregal, Álvaro Obregón, Mexico City, serving preschool through senior high school (preparatoria). It was founded by Madame Marie Flavie Arnaud.

References

External links
 Colegio Francés del Pedregal 

High schools in Mexico City
Álvaro Obregón, Mexico City
Private schools in Mexico